Abdullah Al Dhanhani (Arabic:عبد الله الظنحاني) (born 13 August 1994) is an Emirati footballer who plays as a defender for Dibba Al Fujairah Club in the emirate of Fujairah, United Arab Emirates.

Career

Al Urooba
Al-Dhannhani started his career at Al Urooba and is a product of the Al Urooba's youth system.

Al-Wahda
On 16 July 2017 left Al Urooba and signed with Al-Wahda .

Emirates Club
On 28 September 2017 left Al-Wahda and signed with Emirates Club on loan to season . On 21 October 2017, Al Dhanhani made his professional debut for Emirates Club against Al Ain in the Pro League .

Al-Fujairah
On 12 June 2018 left Al-Wahda and signed with Al-Fujairah on loan to season . On 23 February 2019, Al Dhanhani made his professional debut for Al-Fujairah against Ajman in the Pro League, replacing Fernando Gabriel .

Dibba
On 23 July 2019 left Al-Wahda and he signed with Dibba.

External links

References

1994 births
Living people
Emirati footballers
Al Urooba Club players
Al Wahda FC players
Emirates Club players
Fujairah FC players
Dibba FC players
UAE Pro League players
UAE First Division League players
Association football defenders
Place of birth missing (living people)